Matt Paradis (born October 12, 1989) is an American football center who is a free agent. He was drafted by the Denver Broncos in the sixth round of the 2014 NFL Draft. He played college football at Boise State.

Professional career
Paradis was one of 51 collegiate offensive linemen to attend the NFL Scouting Combine in Indianapolis, Indiana. He completed all of the combine drills and had a mediocre performance overall, finishing 11th in the three-cone drill and 20th among offensive linemen in the bench press. On March 14, 2014, he attended Boise State's pro day, but opted to stand on his combine numbers and only ran positional drills. At the conclusion of the pre-draft process, Paradis was projected to be a seventh round pick or priority undrafted free agent by NFL draft experts and scouts. He was ranked the 15th best center prospect in the draft by NFLDraftScout.com.

Denver Broncos
The Denver Broncos selected Paradis in the sixth round (207th overall) of the 2014 NFL Draft. He was the ninth center selected in 2014.

2014
On June 2, 2014, the Denver Broncos signed Paradis to a four-year, $2.31 million contract that includes a signing bonus of $91,000.

Throughout training camp, he competed for a roster spot against Will Montgomery. On August 30, 2014, the Denver Broncos waived Paradis and signed him to their practice squad on September 1, 2014. On January 15, 2015, the Denver Broncos signed Paradis to a reserve/future contract.

2015
Throughout training camp, Paradis competed against Gino Gradkowski for the vacant starting center role after Manny Ramirez and Will Montgomery both departed during free agency. Head coach Gary Kubiak named Paradis the starting center to begin the regular season.

He made his first career start and professional regular season debut in the Denver Broncos' season-opening 19–13 victory over the Baltimore Ravens. Paradis started all 16 regular season games and helped the Broncos attain a 12–4 record and finish atop the AFC West. On January 17, 2016, he started his first career playoff game as the Broncos defeated the Pittsburgh Steelers 23–16 in the AFC divisional playoff game. The Denver Broncos 
went on to defeat the New England Patriots and play against the Carolina Panthers in Super Bowl 50. Paradis started in the Super Bowl and helped his team defeat the Carolina Panthers by a score of 24–10. Paradis played exceptionally well throughout his first season as a starter and was ranked the best center in the NFL in 2015 by Pro Football Focus and was also ranked the fourth overall center by the Bleacher Report. Due to his contract and his snap count, Paradis earned a player performance bonus of $391,647. It was the largest performance bonus of any player in 2015. He allowed 29 quarterback pressures and received a pass blocking efficiency of 96.6 from Pro Football Focus. It ranked 19th among all centers in 2015.

2016
On April 14, 2016, the Denver Broncos signed Paradis to a one-year, $525,000 contract.

He started all 16 regular season games and helped the Broncos finish 9–7. Paradis played 2,392 snaps out of a possible 2,402 snaps in 2016 and only allowed 17 quarterback pressures. Pro Football Focus gave Paradis a pass blocking efficiency of 97.9, which ranked 13th among all centers. He also received an overall grade of 90.7 from PFF that finished first among all centers. The Denver Broncos finished with a 9–7 record and did not qualify for the playoffs. Head coach Gary Kubiak announced his retirement after the season, due to health concerns. As the Broncos' starting center, Paradis received a player performance bonus of $306,002, which was the highest player performance bonus of any player on the Broncos' roster.

2017
On March 7, 2017, the Denver Broncos signed Paradis to his exclusive rights tender under the terms of one-year, $615,000 contract. Due to his exclusive rights tender, he was unable to negotiate with any other team, but became a restricted free agent in 2018.

Paradis missed organized team activities and the beginning of training camp after undergoing arthroscopic surgery on both his hips during the offseason. He returned to training camp after receiving medical clearance in July. Head coach Vance Joseph named Paradis the starting center to begin the regular season, ahead of Connor McGovern and Dillon Day. Paradis started all 16 regular season games for the third consecutive season.

2018
On March 12, 2018, the Broncos placed a second-round restricted free agent tender on Paradis. He started the first nine games at center before suffering a fractured fibula in Week 9. He was placed on injured reserve on November 12, 2018.

Carolina Panthers
On March 14, 2019, Paradis signed a three-year, $27 million contract with the Carolina Panthers.

Paradis suffered a torn ACL in Week 9 of the 2021 season and was placed on injured reserve on November 8, 2021.

References

External links
Denver Broncos bio
Boise State Broncos bio

1989 births
Living people
People from Council, Idaho
Players of American football from Idaho
American football centers
Boise State Broncos football players
Denver Broncos players
Carolina Panthers players
Ed Block Courage Award recipients